Qasemabad (also Romanized as Qāsemābād; also known as Qāsemābād-e Bozorg) is a village in Piveh Zhan Rural District, Ahmadabad District, Mashhad County, Razavi Khorasan Province, Iran. At the 2006 census, its population was 207, in 98 families.

References 

Populated places in Mashhad County